Albania and the Czech Republic established diplomatic relations on July 5, 1922.  Albania has an embassy in Prague and the Czech Republic has an embassy in Tirana. Both countries are members of OSCE and NATO.
Also Albania is an EU candidate and Czech Republic is an EU member.

See also
 Accession of Albania to the European Union
 Foreign relations of Albania
 Foreign relations of the Czech Republic

References

External links
Albanian embassy in Prague

 
Czech Republic
Bilateral relations of the Czech Republic